Filtvet Lighthouse is a coastal lighthouse in the municipality of Hurum in Viken, Norway. It was first established in 1840, and was replaced by a light in 1985. It was listed as a protected site in 1997.

See also

Lighthouses in Norway
List of lighthouses in Norway

References

External links

 Norsk Fyrhistorisk Forening 

Lighthouses completed in 1840
Lighthouses in Viken
Listed lighthouses in Norway
Hurum